Sefnyn was a Welsh language court poet from Anglesey, north Wales. His son, GWILYM ap SEFNYN, was also a poet.

References

Welsh-language poets
14th-century Welsh poets
People from Anglesey